Progress 21 was a Soviet uncrewed Progress cargo spacecraft, which was launched in May 1984 to resupply the Salyut 7 space station.

Launch
Progress 21 launched on 7 May 1984 from the Baikonur Cosmodrome in the Kazakh SSR. It used a Soyuz-U rocket.

Docking
Progress 21 docked with the aft port of Salyut 7 on 10 May 1984 at 00:10 UTC, and was undocked on 26 May 1984 at 09:41 UTC.

Decay
It remained in orbit until 26 May 1984, when it was deorbited. The deorbit burn occurred at 15:00:30 UTC, with the mission ending at around 15:45 UTC.

See also

 1984 in spaceflight
 List of Progress missions
 List of uncrewed spaceflights to Salyut space stations

References

Progress (spacecraft) missions
1984 in the Soviet Union
Spacecraft launched in 1984
Spacecraft which reentered in 1984
Spacecraft launched by Soyuz-U rockets